Guilherme Leme Marcos Garcia (born 29 September 1960 in Lençóis Paulista) is a Brazilian actor.

Career 
Guilherme Leme studied amateur theater in Colégio Objetivo in São Paulo and then at PUC-SP. He had dance classes with Ivaldo Bertazzo, Maria Duchene and Sônia Mota. In New York City, he attended courses of music, dance, mime and theater.

Early in his career, he helped found the Companhia de Teatro São Paulo Brasil, and participated in festivals around the country. In addition to performing, Guilherme has produced several shows like Decadência, Eduardo II, Felizes da Vida, among others.

In his long career, he participated in the telenovelas Bambolê, Bebê a Bordo, Vamp, Perigosas Peruas and De Corpo e Alma. He made a cameo in the children's series Sítio do Picapau Amarelo.

In the cinema, he acted in the movies Benjamim, Erotique and Anjos da Noite. In the latter film, the actor won the Gramado Film Festival award for best supporting actor.

In 2011, he made a cameo on the telenovela Insensato Coração.

Currently, he has been directing plays and also interpreted Meursault in a monologue based on Albert Camus novel L'étranger.

On 13 July 2013, it was reported that Guilherme is treating a throat cancer in the A. C. Camargo hospital. At the end of the treatment, on April 18, 2014, gave an interview to the magazine Quem revealing being cured of cancer.

After 5 years away from television, he returns in A Terra Prometida'', Rede Record.

Filmography

Television

Film

References

External links 

1960 births
Living people
Brazilian male television actors
Brazilian male telenovela actors
Brazilian male film actors
Brazilian male stage actors
People from São Paulo (state)